The name Colin has been used for three tropical cyclones in the Atlantic Ocean, one in the Australian region of the South Pacific Ocean and one in the South-West Indian Ocean.

In the Atlantic:

 Tropical Storm Colin (2010), heavily sheared storm which moved across the Atlantic, dissipated before reaching Bermuda
 Tropical Storm Colin (2016), poorly organized and weak tropical storm that made landfall in Florida causing considerable damage
 Tropical Storm Colin (2022), short-lived and weak tropical storm that made landfall in South Carolina

In the South Pacific:

 Cyclone Colin (1976), moved parallel to the eastern coast of Australia without making landfall

In the South-West Indian:

 Cyclone Colin (2014), churned through the open ocean, never threatened land 

Atlantic hurricane set index articles
Australian region cyclone set index articles
South-West Indian Ocean cyclone set index articles